A Desperate Chance for Ellery Queen is a 1942 American mystery film directed by James P. Hogan and written by Eric Taylor. It is based on the 1940 play A Good Samaritan by Ellery Queen. The film stars William Gargan, Margaret Lindsay, Charley Grapewin, John Litel, Lilian Bond and James Burke. The film was released on May 7, 1942, by Columbia Pictures.

Plot

While on a business trip to California, Ellery and Nikki get involved with a man who was presumed dead, but is now suspected in embezzlement, money laundering, and murder.  They manage to keep one step ahead of both the crooks and the law.

Cast          
William Gargan as Ellery Queen
Margaret Lindsay as Nikki Porter
Charley Grapewin as Inspector Queen
John Litel as Norman Hadley
Lilian Bond as Adele Belden
James Burke as Sergeant Velie
Jack La Rue as Tommy Gould
Morgan Conway as Ray Stafford 
Noel Madison as George Belden
Frank M. Thomas as Capt. H.T. Daley
Charlotte Wynters as Mrs. Irene Evington Hadley

References

External links
 

1942 films
American mystery films
1942 mystery films
Columbia Pictures films
Films directed by James Patrick Hogan
American black-and-white films
1940s English-language films
1940s American films
Ellery Queen films